Liver International is a bimonthly peer-reviewed medical journal covering hepatology. It was established in 1981 under the title Liver, obtaining its current name in 2003. It is published by John Wiley & Sons on behalf of the International Association for the Study of the Liver, of which it is the official journal. The editor-in-chief is Luca Valenti. According to the Journal Citation Reports, the journal has a 2021 impact factor of 8.754, ranking it 18th out of 93 journals in the category "Gastroenterology & Hepatology".

References

External links

Wiley (publisher) academic journals
Gastroenterology and hepatology journals
English-language journals
Bimonthly journals
Academic journals associated with international learned and professional societies